Government Regional Eye Hospital, also known as Dr. Rednam Surya Prasadrao Government Regional Eye Hospital, is located in Rama Talkies Road, Visakhapatnam. It is the only government eye hospital serving Andhra Pradesh. This hospital is named for famous eye surgeon Rednam Surya Prasad.

References

Eye care in India
Hospitals in Visakhapatnam
Hospitals established in 1981
1981 establishments in Andhra Pradesh